Usta may refer to the following people:

Given name 
 Usta Murad (1570–1640), corsair captain and later Dey of Tunis

Surname 
 Berkin Usta (born 2000), Turkish Olympian alpine skier
 Fuat Usta (born 1972), Turkish association football coach and former player
 Hisam-ud-din Usta (1910–1987), Indian artist
 Jorge García Usta (1960–2005), Colombian novelist (surname is not "Usta" but García)
 Sabahattin Usta (born 1990), Turkish football player
 Suat Usta (born 1981), Turkish football player